Jacey Sallés is a British actress. She portrayed the role of Ramona Ramirez across all five series of ITV drama Cold Feet, and reprised the role when the series was revived. She has also appeared in television shows Hollyoaks, Keith Lemon: Coming in America and My Family, as well as the films Attack the Block and The Misadventures of Margaret. In 2019, she began appearing in Casualty as Rosa Cadenas.

Career 
Sallés rose to fame playing Ramona Ramirez, the Marsden family's "fiery Spanish nanny", in the ITV drama Cold Feet between 1997 and 2003. She reprised the role for the revived series in 2016. In August 2016, it was announced that Sallés had been cast in a guest role on Hollyoaks, portraying "glamorous and feisty" Juanita Salvador Martinez Hernandez De La Cruz, the mother of established character Diego Salvador Martinez Hernandez De La Cruz (Juan Pablo Yepez). She appeared in six episodes, originally broadcast in September 2016.

In May 2019, it was announced that Sallés would join the cast of the BBC One medical drama Casualty as hospital porter Rosa Cadenas, who would be part of an "interesting story" with established character David Hide (Jason Durr). Sallés has also appeared in the 2011 film Attack the Block and the 1998 romantic comedy The Misadventures of Margaret. Additionally, she has appeared in small roles in Keith Lemon: Coming in America, Doctors, Holby City and My Family.

Filmography

References

External links

1965 births
British actresses
English people of Spanish descent
Living people
British soap opera actresses 
British film actresses 
British television actresses